Helin is a lake which lies in Vang Municipality in Innlandet county, Norway. The southeastern shore of the lake forms the municipal border with neighboring Vestre Slidre. The lake is regulated for power production by the nearby Åbjøra hydroelectric power station.

In 1930, a  area between the lakes Helin and Syndin (to the northeast) was recognized as a botanical plant park.

See also
List of lakes in Norway

References

Vang, Innlandet
Lakes of Innlandet